Pectobacterium wasabiae is a plant pathogenic bacterium that was first reported to cause disease on wasabi plants. A closely related species, yet to be formally named, also causes disease on potato. Unlike most Pectobacterium, P. wasabiae strains lack a type III secretion system. Its type strain is CFBP 3304T(=LMG 8404T =NCPPB 3701T =ICMP 9121T).

References

Further reading 
 
 Janse, Jacob Dirk. Phytobacteriology: principles and practice. Cabi, 2005.
 Gnanamanickam, Samuel S., ed. Plant-associated bacteria. Springer, 2006.

External links 
 LPSN
 
 Type strain of Pectobacterium wasabiae at BacDive -  the Bacterial Diversity Metadatabase

Enterobacterales
Bacterial plant pathogens and diseases
Bacteria described in 2003